Vasyl Yaroslavovych Slipak (20 December 1974 – 29 June 2016) was a Ukrainian baritone opera singer. From 1994 he frequently performed in France at such venues as Paris Opera and Opéra Bastille. For his opera performance, Slipak received several awards, including "Best Male Performance" for the Toreador Song. A volunteer in the Ukrainian army, Slipak was killed during the war in Donbass by a Russian sniper near the village of Luhanske, in Bakhmut region. He was posthumously awarded the title of Hero of Ukraine for his work as a volunteer soldier.

Opera career
Born in 1974 in Lviv, Slipak liked to sing since his childhood. At the age of 11, Slipak joined the Lviv children's choir group Dudarik. After that, he continued his education at the Lviv Conservatory. During his education, Slipak participated in a vocal contest in the French city of Clermont, winning the contest. In 1996, Slipak received an invitation to perform at Opéra Bastille in Paris. In 1997 Slipak graduated from the Lysenko Music Academy in Lviv and then was invited to the Paris Opera where he became an opera singer. By 2011, he was at the top of his field, winning the prize for best male performer at the Armel Opera Competition and Festival in Szeged, Hungary, for his rendering of the Toreador Song from the opera Carmen.

Repertoire

Escamillo / Carmen / Georges Bizet
Figaro / The Marriage of Figaro / Wolfgang Amadeus Mozart
Ramfis / Aida / Giuseppe Verdi
Boris Godunov / Boris Godunov / Modest Mussorgsky
Igor Svyatoslavich / Prince Igor / Alexander Borodin
Prince Gremin / Eugene Onegin / Pyotr Ilyich Tchaikovsky
Il Commendatore (Don Pedro), Masetto / Don Giovanni / Wolfgang Amadeus Mozart
Lindorf, Dapertutto, Coppélius, Miracle / The Tales of Hoffmann / Jacques Offenbach
Sparafucile / Rigoletto / Giuseppe Verdi
Sarastro, Speaker of the temple, Three priests / The Magic Flute / Wolfgang Amadeus Mozart
Don Giovanni / Don Giovanni / Wolfgang Amadeus Mozart
Colline / La bohème / Giacomo Puccini
Méphistophélès / Faust / Charles Gounod 
Banco / Macbeth / Giuseppe Verdi
Mainfroid, a Sicilian, adherent of Procida / Les vêpres siciliennes / Giuseppe Verdi
Philippe II / Don Carlos / Giuseppe Verdi
Basilio / The Barber of Seville / Gioachino Rossini
Ralph / La jolie fille de Perth / Georges Bizet
Count Rodolfo / La sonnambula / Vincenzo Bellini
Don Alfonso / Così fan tutte / Wolfgang Amadeus Mozart
Demon / The Demon / Anton Rubinstein
Forester, Badger, Harašta, the poacher / The Cunning Little Vixen / Leoš Janáček
Death, Loudspeaker / Der Kaiser von Atlantis / Viktor Ullmann

Death
Slipak returned to Ukraine and participated in the Euromaidan in 2014. In 2015, Slipak joined the fights against pro-Russian separatists as a member of the 7th Battalion of the Volunteer Ukrainian Corps of the Right Sector. He took the military call sign Mif, a reference to his favorite aria of Mephistopheles from the opera Faust (his informal call sign was Myth). After the war in Donbass, Slipak planned to continue his career in Paris.

On 29 June 2016, at approximately 6 a.m., Slipak was killed by a sniper shot near Luhanske. Slipak's life was the subject of the 2018 documentary film Myth.

Ukrainian President Petro Poroshenko has awarded posthumously the title of Hero of Ukraine to Slipak.

References

External links

НСКУ "П"ЄРО МЕРТВОПЕТЛЮЄ" Камерна кантата. – В.СЛІПАК (контртенор)

1974 births
2016 deaths
21st-century Ukrainian male opera singers
Ukrainian baritones
Musicians from Lviv
Ukrainian expatriates in France
Deaths by firearm in Ukraine
Ukrainian military personnel of the war in Donbas
Ukrainian military personnel killed in the Russo-Ukrainian War
Recipients of the Order of Gold Star (Ukraine)
Burials at Lychakiv Cemetery
Military personnel killed in war in Donbas